The Grand Annual Sprintcar Classic is an Australian dirt Sprint car racing meet that takes place at the Sungold Stadium Premier Speedway in Warrnambool, Victoria every year in late January. The classic traditionally takes place one week before the Australian Sprintcar Championship.

The event was first run in 1973 and was won by Ian "Zeke" Agars from Adelaide, who drove a Straight-six Holden-powered supermodified to victory in the 40 lap final.

Sydney racer, ten time Australian champion Garry Rush, has the best record in the event claiming seven victories. During the 1980s and early 1990s Rush had a rivalry with American driver Danny Smith who won the Classic six times during roughly the same period.  Rush also noted in 1984 that the race has more prestige than the traditional Australian Sprintcar Championship because it is open to all drivers, not just Australians (as is the rule for the Sprintcar Championship), and is the most important race of the year for Australians because of its all-comers format.

Because of its mid-summer date, when the North American season has not started, drivers from the United States will often arrive to race in the December and January races on the Australian Sprintcar Tours.  Ten Americans have won the Grand Annual, including World of Outlaws series champions Danny Lasoski and Donny Schatz. As with the Australian Championship, drivers from New South Wales have dominated the event with 18 wins. The home state of Victoria had to wait until the 20th running of the event to have a home winner with Warrnambool's own Max Dumesny winning in 1992.

The race is regarded as the largest car count in sprint car racing.  In the 2015 meeting, 107 cars participated, compared to the previous August's Knoxville Nationals, where 105 cars were entered.

Winners since 1973

See also
 Sport in Australia

References

External links
Grand Annual Sprintcar Classic winners

Auto races in Australia
Speedway in Australia
Sports competitions in Victoria (Australia)
Warrnambool